Johann Becker (1932–2004) was a Brazilian entomologist who made important contributions to the study of insects in Brazil. He worked at the National Museum of Brazil. The assassin bug Ghilianella beckeri was named after him.

References

1932 births
2004 deaths
Brazilian entomologists
20th-century Brazilian zoologists